King Golf (stylized as KING GOLF) is a Japanese manga series written and illustrated by Ken Sasaki. It was serialized by Shogakukan in the shōnen manga magazine Weekly Shōnen Sunday from August 2008 to October 2011, and later transferred to Shōnen Sunday S in January 2012. Its chapters have been collected into 40 tankōbon volumes as of January 2023. It follows the story of high school student Sōsuke Yūke, as he begins his career in golf and over time obtains many wins and defeats various opponents. King Golf won the 56th Shogakukan Manga Award for the shōnen category in 2011.

Story
, known as "the predator", is a young talented delinquent skilled at fighting. He has fought near everyone to reign supreme in his region. One day he realizes that people may fear him, but they do not admire him. On that day, a prodigy amateur golf player looks down on the young delinquent. Sōsuke, infuriated, ends up getting involved in the golf world to get revenge. With inspirational drive, courage and competitiveness, Sōsuke is fully committed to overcome every rival and become the "king of golf".

Publication
King Golf, written and illustrated by Ken Sasaki, was first published in Shogakukan's Weekly Shōnen Sunday from August 6, 2008, to October 12, 2011. It was transferred to Shōnen Sunday S on January 25, 2012. Shogakukan has compiled its individual chapters into individual tankōbon volumes. The first volume was published on January 16, 2009. As of January 18, 2023, forty volumes have been published.

Volume list

Reception
King Golf won the award for Best shōnen manga at the 56th Shogakukan Manga Award in 2011.

Notelist

References

External links
King Golf at Web Sunday 

2008 manga
Golf in anime and manga
Shogakukan manga
Shōnen manga
Winners of the Shogakukan Manga Award for shōnen manga